Guido Rocca (26 January 1928, in Milan – 15 May 1961) was an Italian writer.

Works

Novels
 L'importanza di avere un cavallo (racconto), 1950 (poi Milano, Mursia, 1962). (1º premio ex aequo "Olimpiadi della Cultura", Genova)
 Si spensero i fuochi, Genova, Seit, 1951. (romanzo)
 La ragazza imprudente, Milano, Corticelli, 1956.
 Romanzi, racconti, teatro (Storie di Andi, Altre storie per Andi, Si spensero i fuochi, La ragazza imprudente, Notte e giorno), a cura di Renato Prinzhofer, Mursia, Milano, 1962.

Plays 
 La marcia su Roma (1960).
 Il club delle belle speranze (1946), Milano, Mursia, 1962. 
 I coccodrilli (1956), in Sipario, n.129, gennaio 1957. E.I.S.T. VII/IX-1958; Mursia, Milano, 1962.
 La conquista di Roma (1957), ib., 1962.<ref>In tre atti, rappresentato dalla Compagnia Cesco Baseggio, al Teatro Nuovo di Via Giustiniani, Trieste, dal 21 marzo (opp. 13 maggio) 1958. Interpreti principali: Cesco Baseggio (Piero Curtoli); Margherita Seglin (Ada); Carlo Micheluzzi (Commendator Lazzeri). Cfr.: [http://memoria-attori.amati.fupress.net/S1010?tipo=0&idspettacolo=80257&genere=-1&idcollegato=5964&contesto=8 La conquista di Roma (1958)], in memoria-attori.amati.fupress.net</ref>
 Una montagna di carta (1958), in Sipario, giugno 1958; poi Mursia, Milano, 1962.
 Il solito esagono ovvero Legati così (1959), Mursia, Milano, 1962.
 Un blues per Silvia (riproposto anche col nuovo titolo di « Nient'altro che nostalgia ») (1959), ib., 1962.
 Mare e whisky (1959), in Sipario, novembre 1959; Mursia, Milano, 1962.
 La rivolta dei giovani (1960), Mursia, Milano, 1962.
 Il fagiano Gaetano, favola di caccia'' (1961), disegni di Giulio Cingoli e Giancarlo Carloni, Milano, Mursia, 1961 (poi 1962; e, nuova ed., illustrazioni di Mario Pandiani, Milano, Emme, 1983). (favola per bambini)

References

1928 births
1961 deaths
20th-century Italian writers
20th-century Italian male writers